Pietro Antonio Avanzini (1656–1733) was an Italian painter.

Biography
He was born in Piacenza, trained by Marcantonio Franceschini in Bologna, and described as a painter of little originality, often copying his master's designs Among his works were some paintings in the Duomo of Piacenza, completed under his master in 1686. Also in Piacenza, for the chapel of Saint Bernardino da Siena in the church of Basilica di Santa Maria di Campagna, a Madonna and saints; and for the churches of San Giovanni in Canale, San Simone, San Protasio, and the Chiesa della Morte.

References

1656 births
1733 deaths
People from Piacenza
17th-century Italian painters
Italian male painters
18th-century Italian painters
Italian Baroque painters
Painters from Bologna
18th-century Italian male artists